Tim Renwick is the first solo album by English guitarist Tim Renwick, released in 1980. Gary Brooker was among the guest artists playing on the album.

Track listing
All songs by Tim Renwick, except where noted.

 "Members of the Hard School"
 "Perfect Strangers"
 "Alison's Cold Tonight"
 "Stay Young" (Benny Gallagher, Graham Lyle)
 "Lip Service"
 "Dark Island" - instrumental (Traditional)
 "Two-way Track"
 "When He Rides Away"
 "Speak Louder"
 "Havana Moon" (Chuck Berry)
 "Nobody Here"

Personnel 
Tim Renwick – guitars, flute, vocals
Charlie Harrison - bass guitar
Tim Gorman - electric piano, piano, Polymoog, organ
Henry Spinetti - drums
with:
Dave Wintour – bass guitar on "Speak Louder" and "Nobody Here"
Mo Foster – bass guitar on "Alison's Cold Tonight"
Gary Brooker – keyboards, Yamaha CS-80, piano on "Lip Service", "Dark Island" and "Two-Way Track"
Mick Burns – drums on "Speak Louder" and "Nobody Here"
Noosha Fox – guest vocalist on "Perfect Strangers" and "Havana Moon"
Glyn Johns – synthesizer on "Dark Island"
Bruce Rowland - snare drum on "Dark Island"

References

1980 debut albums
Tim Renwick albums
Albums produced by Glyn Johns
Columbia Records albums